Poverty of the stimulus (POS) is the controversial argument from linguistics that children are not exposed to rich enough data within their linguistic environments to acquire every feature of their language. This is considered evidence contrary to the empiricist idea that language is learned solely through experience. The claim is that the sentences children hear while learning a language do not contain the information needed to develop a thorough understanding of the grammar of the language.

The POS is often used as evidence for universal grammar. This is the idea that all languages conform to the same structural principles, which define the space of possible languages. Both poverty of the stimulus and universal grammar are terms that can be credited to Noam Chomsky, the main proponent of generative grammar. Chomsky coined the term "poverty of the stimulus" in 1980. However, he had argued for the idea since his 1959 review of B.F. Skinner's Verbal Behavior.

The form of the argument
An argument from the poverty of the stimulus generally takes the following structure:

 The speech that children are exposed to is consistent with numerous possible grammars.
 It is possible to define data, D, that would distinguish the target grammar from all other grammars that are consistent with the input.
 D is missing from speech to children.
 Children nonetheless acquire the target grammar.
 Therefore, the right grammatical structure arises due to some (possibly linguistic) property of the child.

Background and history
Chomsky coined the term "poverty of the stimulus" in 1980. This idea is closely related to what Chomsky calls "Plato's Problem". He outlined this philosophical approach in the first chapter of the Knowledge of Language in 1986. Plato's Problem traces back to Meno, a Socratic dialogue. In Meno, Socrates unearths knowledge of geometry concepts from a slave who was never explicitly taught them. Plato's Problem directly parallels the idea of the innateness of language, universal grammar, and more specifically the poverty of the stimulus argument because it reveals that people's knowledge is richer than what they are exposed to. Chomsky illustrates that humans are not exposed to all structures of their language, yet they fully achieve knowledge of these structures.

Linguistic nativism is the theory that humans are born with some knowledge of language. One acquires a language not entirely through experience. According to Noam Chomsky, "The speed and precision of vocabulary acquisition leaves no real alternative to the conclusion that the child somehow has the concepts available before experience with language and is basically learning labels for concepts that are already a part of his or her conceptual apparatus." One of the most significant arguments generative grammarians have for linguistic nativism is the poverty of the stimulus argument.

Pullum and Scholz frame the poverty of the stimulus argument by examining all of the ways that the input is insufficient for language acquisition. First, children are exposed only to positive evidence. They do not receive explicit correction or instruction about what is not possible in the language. Second, the input that children receive is degenerate in terms of scope and quality. Degeneracy of scope means that the input does not contain information about the full extent of any grammatical rules. Degeneracy of quality means that children are exposed to speech errors, utterances by nonnative speakers, and false starts, potentially obscuring the grammatical structure of the language. Furthermore, the linguistic data each child is exposed to is different and so the basis for learning is idiosyncratic. However, despite these insufficiencies, children eventually acquire the grammar of the language they are exposed to.  Further, other organisms in the same environment do not.  From the nativists' point of view, the insufficiency of the input leads to the conclusion that humans are hard-wired with a UG and thus support the innateness hypothesis.

However, the argument that the poverty of the stimulus supports the innateness hypothesis remains controversial.  For example, Fiona Cowie claims that the Poverty of Stimulus argument fails "on both empirical and conceptual grounds to support nativism".

Examples 
Generative Grammarians have extensively studied the hypothesised innate effects on language in order to provide evidence for Poverty of the Stimulus. An overarching theme in examples is that children acquire grammatical rules based on evidence that is consistent with multiple generalizations. And since children are not instructed in the grammar of their language, the gap must be filled in by properties of the learner.

Syntax

Binding theory – Principle C
 While he was dancing, the Ninja Turtle ate pizza.
 He ate pizza while the Ninja Turtle was dancing.
In general, pronouns can refer to any prominent individual in the discourse context. However, a pronoun cannot find its antecedent in certain structural positions, as defined by the Binding Theory. For example, the pronoun "he" can refer to the Ninja Turtle in (1) but not (2), above. Given that speech to children does not indicate what interpretations are impossible, the input is equally consistent with a grammar that allows coreference between "he" and "the Ninja Turtle" in (2) and one that does not. But, since all speakers of English recognize that (2) does not allow this coreference, this aspect of the grammar must come from some property internal to the learner.

Passives
 I believe the dog to be hungry
 The dog is believed to be hungry
 I believe the dog's owner to be hungry.
 The dog's owner is believed to be hungry.
 * The dog is believed's owner to be hungry.
The sentences in (1) and (2) illustrate the active-passive alternation in English. The Noun Phrase after the verb in the active (1) is the subject in the passive (2). Data like (2) would be compatible with a passive rule stated in terms of linear order (move the 1st NP after the verb) or syntactic structure (move the highest NP after the verb). The data in (3-5) illustrate that the actual rule is formulated in terms of structure. If it were stated in terms of linear order, then (4) would be ungrammatical and (5) would be grammatical. But the opposite is true. However, children may not be exposed to sentences like (3-5) as evidence in favor of the correct grammar. Thus, the fact that all adult speakers agree that (4) is grammatical and (5) is not suggests that the linear rule was never even considered and that children are predisposed to a structure based grammatical system.

Anaphoric "one"
The English word "one" can refer back to a previously mentioned property in the discourse. For example in (1), "one" can mean "ball". 
 I like this ball and you like that one. 
 I like this red ball and you like that one. 
In (2), one is interpreted as "red ball." However, even if a speaker intends (2) in this way, it would be difficult to distinguish that interpretation from one in which "one" simply meant "ball". This is because when a speaker refers to a red ball, they are also referring to a ball since the set of red balls is a subset of balls in general. 18-month-olds, like adults, show that they believe 'one' refers to 'red ball' and not 'ball'. The evidence available to children is systematically ambiguous between a grammar in which "one" refers back to Nouns and one in which "one" refers back to noun phrases. Despite this ambiguity, children learn the more narrow interpretation, suggesting that some property other than the input is responsible for their interpretations.

Island effects
In Wh-questions, the Wh-word at the beginning of the sentence (the filler) is related to a position later in the sentence (the gap). This relation can hold over an unbounded distance, as in (1). However, there are restrictions on the gap positions that a filler can be related to. These restrictions are called syntactic islands (2). Because questions with islands are ungrammatical, they are not included in the speech that children hear—but neither are grammatical Wh-questions that span multiple clauses. Because the speech children are exposed to is consistent with grammars which have island constraints and grammars which don't, something internal to the child must contribute this knowledge.
What did you claim that Jack bought _ ?
*What did you make the claim that Jack bought _ ? (Complex Noun Phrase Island)

Phonology

Learning stress systems 
Bergelson & Idsardi (2009) presented adults with words drawn from an artificial language. The words contained 3 CV syllables. If the last vowel was long, then it bore stress. Otherwise, stress fell on the first syllable. This pattern is consistent with two grammars. In one grammar, a long vowel bears stress if it is the last segment in the word. This is a rule based on absolute finality. In the other grammar, a long vowel bears stress only if it is the last vowel in the word (i.e., even if it is not the last segment of the word). This is a rule based on relative finality. In natural languages stress rules make reference to relative finality but not to absolute finality. After being exposed to these words, participants were then tested to see whether they thought that a word with a long vowel in a closed syllable (CVVC) would bear stress. If it did, then that would be consistent with the relative-final grammar, but not with the absolute-final grammar. English-speaking adults (tested through computer software) were more likely to accept the words from the relative-final grammar than from the absolute-final grammar. Since the data they were exposed to was equally consistent with both grammars, and since neither rule is a rule of English, the source of this decision must have come from the participants, not from any aspect of their experience. In addition, eighth-month-old children (tested via the Headturn Preference Procedure) were found to have the same preference as adults. Given that this preference could not have come from their exposure to either the artificial language or to their native language, the researchers concluded that human language acquisition mechanisms are "hardwired" to lead infants towards certain generalizations, consistent with the argument for the poverty of the stimulus.

English plural marker 

Halle (1978) argues that the morphophonological rule governing the English plural produces forms that are consistent with two grammars. In one grammar, the plural is pronounced as [s] if it follows one of the sounds [p, t, k, f, θ]; otherwise it is pronounced as [z]. In the other grammar, the plural is pronounced as [s] if it follows a voiceless consonant. These rules are exactly equal in their coverage of English since the set of consonants that triggers the [s] pronunciation is identical in the two cases. Since there is "no indication" that speakers could have acquired this knowledge, Halle argues that the tendency to build rules in terms of natural classes comes from a factor internal to the child and not from their experience.

Semantics

Word learning 

The poverty of the stimulus also applies in the domain of word learning. When learning a new word, children are exposed to examples of the word's referent, but not to the full extent of the category. For example, in learning the word "dog", a child might see a German Shepherd, a Great Dane and a Poodle. How do they know to extend this category to include Dachshunds and Bulldogs? The situations in which the word is used cannot provide the relevant information. Thus, something internal to learners must shape the way that they generalize. This problem is closely related to Quine's gavagai problem.

Attitude verbs 
In other cases, words refer to aspects of the world that cannot be observed directly. For example Lila Gleitman poses a POS argument with respect to verbs that label mental states. She observes that a learner cannot see inside another person's mind, and so an utterance of "Kim thinks that it is raining" is likely to occur in the same kinds of contexts as "Kim wonders if it is raining" or even "Kim wants it to rain". If no aspect of the context can determine whether a mental state verb refers to thinkings, wanting or wonderings, then some aspect of children's minds must direct their attention to other cues. Thus, our ability to learn these word meanings must be shaped by factors internal to the child and not simply from the conditions of their use.

Criticism
Critics claimed in the 1980s and 1990s that Chomsky's purported linguistic evidence for poverty of the stimulus may have been false. Around the same time there was research in applied linguistics and neuroscience that rejected the idea of significant aspects of languages being innate and not learned. Some scholars working on language acquisition in fields like psychology and applied linguistics  reject most claims of nativism and consider that decades of research have been wasted since 1964 owing to the assumption of the poverty of the stimulus---an enterprise which has failed to make a lasting impact. However, those working in the framework of generative grammar consider nativism to be a logical necessity and to be supported by the existence of deep parallels among the languages of the world.

See also

 Colorless green ideas sleep furiously
 Educating Eve: The 'Language Instinct' Debate
 Empiricism
 Generative Anthropology
 Government and binding
 Innatism
 Language acquisition
 Language module
 Nature versus nurture
 Principles and parameters
 Psychological nativism
 Rationalism
 Semantics
 Syntax
 Tabula rasa
 Universal grammar

References

Further reading

External links
  Essay on Gold's proof, learnability and feedback.
 

Psycholinguistics
Language acquisition
Generative linguistics